The 2012 Asian Junior Women's Volleyball Championship was held in Nakhon Pathom and Ratchaburi, Thailand from  1 – 9 October 2012.

Venues
 Nakhon Pathom Sports Center Gymnasium, Nakhon Pathom – Pool B, D, E, G and Final Round
 Ratchaburi Gymnasium, Ratchaburi – Pool A, C, F, H and Final Round

Pools composition
The teams are seeded based on their final ranking at the 2010 Asian Junior Women's Volleyball Championship.

* Malaysia withdrew, Turkmenistan replaced Malaysia in Pool D to balance the number of teams in each group.

Preliminary round

Pool A

|}

|}

Pool B

|}

|}

Pool C

|}

|}

Pool D

|}

|}

Classification round
 The results and the points of the matches between the same teams that were already played during the preliminary round shall be taken into account for the classification round.

Pool E

|}

|}

Pool F

|}

|}

Pool G

|}

|}

Pool H

|}

|}

Classification 13th–16th

Semifinals

|}

15th place

|}

13th place

|}

Classification 9th–12th

Semifinals

|}

11th place

|}

9th place

|}

Final round

Quarterfinals

|}

5th–8th semifinals

|}

Semifinals

|}

7th place

|}

5th place

|}

3rd place

|}

Final

|}

Final standing

Team Roster
Wang Ning, Zheng Yixin, Chen Jiao, Zhu Ting, Tang Ningya, Chen Xintong, Li Weiwei, Huang Liuyan, Zhao Xiyu, Xu Ruayo, Wang Fengjiao, Yang Fangxu
Head Coach: Xu Jiande

Awards
 MVP:  Zhu Ting
 Best Scorer:  Kuttika Kaewpin
 Best Spiker:  Zhu Ting
 Best Blocker:  Zheng Yixin
 Best Server:  Tang Ningya
 Best Setter:  Yuki Yamagami
 Best Libero:  Huang Shih-ting

References

External links
www.asianvolleyball.org
 

2012
2012 in women's volleyball
International volleyball competitions hosted by Thailand
Voll
2012 in youth sport